The 2021 NBL Finals was the championship series of the 2020–21 NBL season and the conclusion of the season.

Format 
The finals are being played in June 2021 between the top four teams of the regular season, consisting of two best-of-three semi-final and one best-of-five final series, where the higher seed hosts the first, third and fifth games.

Qualification

Qualified teams

Ladder

Seedings 

 Melbourne United
 Perth Wildcats
 Illawarra Hawks
 South East Melbourne Phoenix

The NBL tie-breaker system as outlined in the NBL Rules and Regulations states that in the case of an identical win–loss record, the overall points percentage will determine order of seeding.

Playoff Bracket

Semi-finals series

(2) Perth Wildcats vs. (3) Illawarra Hawks

(1) Melbourne United vs. (4) South East Melbourne Phoenix

Grand Final series

(1) Melbourne United vs. (2) Perth Wildcats

See also 

 2020–21 NBL season

References 

2021
 Finals